The Bette are a Bantu people inhabiting the Obudu area of Cross River State, Nigeria.

The Bette people are one of five tribes inhabiting Obudu area of Cross River State, along with the Utugwang, Alege, Ukpe and Ubang.

The name "Bette" refers to both the language and the people who constitute a dominant ethnic group in Obudu Local Government Area of Cross River State, Nigeria. Bette migrated from the Bantu in south Central Africa and settled at the foot of the Cameroun Mountain, a part of which now constitutes the famous Obudu Cattle Ranch. Bette is a folk language that is still grossly unwritten because of the dearth of a standard orthography. Most scholars of Linguistics who have researched on some Nigerian folk languages have held ignominious opinion that folk languages reveal a low, primitive level of dynamic and imaginative thinking of the people. Because of the gross dearth of a standard orthography the folks coined their proverbs around the things within their environment which they can see, feel, perceive, touch and easily remember. Consequently, Bette is predominantly proverbious and metaphorical.

References 

Bantu peoples